"Say You Won't Let Go" is a song by English singer and songwriter James Arthur. The song was released as a digital download on 9 September 2016 in the United Kingdom by Columbia Records as the lead single from his second studio album Back from the Edge (2016). The single peaked at the top of the UK Singles Chart, a position it maintained for three weeks. Outside the United Kingdom, the single has topped the charts in Australia, New Zealand, Sweden and the Republic of Ireland. It also became his breakthrough hit in the US, peaking at number 11 on the Billboard Hot 100. In early March, it had gone double platinum in the UK. In May 2018, it was reported that The Script had launched legal proceedings against Arthur due to alleged copyright infringement in regards to the song.

In response to claims that the song sounds similar to The Script's "The Man Who Can't Be Moved", the song's writers initially decided not to pursue legal action. However, following a claim in May 2018, they were successfully awarded a songwriting credit.

Commercial performance
On 12 September 2016, the song was at number 30 on The Official Chart Update in the United Kingdom. On 16 September 2016, the song entered the UK Singles Chart at number 25, and peaked at number one two weeks later, becoming Arthur's second number one and spending three consecutive weeks at the top.  The song was ranked the nineteenth biggest-selling song of 2016 in the UK, making Arthur the biggest-selling British male artist of the year. By the second week of January 2017, it had surpassed the one million sales mark, making him the first-ever X Factor act to have two singles sell over a million copies in his homeland.

In the United States, the song debuted at #100 on the date November 12, 2016. The song peaked at #11 for two non-consecutive weeks being kept out of the top 10 from Malibu by Miley Cyrus the first week and Congratulations by Post Malone the second week. It spent 52 weeks on the chart. The song is his first single to chart on the US Billboard Hot 100, making Arthur only the second winner of The X Factor UK to reach the US top 40 (following Leona Lewis) and only the third winner to chart on the Hot 100 following Lewis and Little Mix. In May 2017, the song reached No. 1 on the Adult Pop Songs Airplay Chart, more than six months after its release in the US. The song was certified diamond in the US by the RIAA on February 15, 2023. The song has sold over 1,208,000 digital copies in the US as of September 2017. It was the eighth best-selling song of 2017 in the US, with 1,195,000 copies sold in 2017.

By 2021, the single had sold 2,676,756 copies in the UK.

On 15 September 2016, the song entered the Irish Singles Chart at number 91 before peaking at number one on 14 October and spending four non-consecutive weeks at the top of the charts. The song has also charted in Australia, France, New Zealand and Sweden. On February 26, 2017, it was announced on Channel 4's Sunday Brunch that the single had sold 2 million copies worldwide.

Music video
A music video to accompany the release of "Say You Won't Let Go" was first released onto YouTube on 9 September 2016 at a total length of three minutes and thirty seconds. On YouTube it has received over 1.2 billion views.

Live performances
 The X Factor (9 October 2016)
 Sunrise (22 November 2016)
 The Late Late Show with James Corden (3 January 2017)
 The Today Show (5 January 2017)
 The Tonight Show Starring Jimmy Fallon (25 April 2017)
 Boy Band (24 August 2017)
 America's Got Talent (20 September 2017)

Track listing

Charts

Weekly charts

Year-end charts

Decade-end charts

Certifications

Release history

See also 
 List of best-selling singles in Australia

References

2016 singles
2016 songs
Black-and-white music videos
Columbia Records singles
Irish Singles Chart number-one singles
James Arthur songs
Number-one singles in Australia
Number-one singles in New Zealand
Number-one singles in Scotland
Number-one singles in Sweden
UK Singles Chart number-one singles
Pop ballads
Songs written by Neil Ormandy
Songs written by James Arthur
Songs involved in plagiarism controversies